St Gothian's Church, Gwithian is a  Grade II* listed parish church in the Church of England Diocese of Truro in Gwithian, Cornwall, England, UK. Nothing is known about St Gothian, Gocianus or Gwithian.

History

The church dates from the 13th century. The tower is 15th century, but most of the church was rebuilt by Edmund Sedding in 1865–1867. The south aisle and arcade were removed and a new south transept was built. The shafts, capitals and bases of the arcade were preserved and used in the construction of a new Lych-gate. The north and south walls of the nave, the transepts and a portion of the chancel were rebuilt. The aumbry from the north transept was restored. A two light window, placed in the south aisle by the Rector a few years previous, was moved to the north wall of the north transept. The end window of the south transept was new. The window in the south wall was filled with stained glass designed by Sedding and made by Mr. Beer of Exeter in memory of the deacon and curate, Mr. Drury, who drowned in 1865. The old north and south doorways were rebuilt. The tower was reopened and the arch thrown into view. The pinnacles of the tower were repaired. The roofs of the nave, transepts and chancel were replaced. The chancel roof was embellished with carving from timber taken from the church at Phillack, which had been restored 10 years before. The reredos was painted by John Sedding, brother of the architect.

Parish status

The church is in a joint parish served by the Godrevy team ministry with:
St Erth's Church, St Erth
St Elwyn's Church, Hayle
St Felicitas and St Piala's Church, Phillack
St Gwinear’s Church, Gwinear

Organ

The church contains an organ by Cousans Sons and Co. A specification of the organ can be found on the National Pipe Organ Register.

See also
St Gwithian's Oratory

References

Gwithian
Gwithian
Grade II* listed buildings in Cornwall
National Heritage List for England
Buildings and structures in Cornwall